Marion Elizabeth Moodie (January 30, 1867 – April 26, 1958) was a Canadian nurse and botanist who was the first nurse to graduate in Alberta. She was also an accomplished poet and writer.

Biography
Born in Quebec City, of Scottish/English descent, Marion Elizabeth Moodie went west to Calgary, with her family, in 1891.

Seven years later she graduated from the Calgary Hospital, the first fully trained nurse to receive her diploma in the province of Alberta. For five years she engaged in private nursing and hospital work in central and southern Alberta, and later in Manitoba. During the war Miss Moodie was nursing sister, and later matron, at Ogden Military Hospital, Calgary.

A keen student and lover of nature, Miss Moodie found time, in her busy pioneer life, to make botanical collections of the flora of Alberta for the provincial government at Edmonton, as well as for such well-known American institutions as the Smithsonian, the New York Botanical Gardens, Harvard University, and the Field Museum, Chicago.

Moodie was also a writer. An earlier book of poems appeared under the title "Songs of the West," and a fairy-tale book, "The Legend of Dryas". Moodie was also  a frequent contributor to Canadian periodicals of articles on pioneer nursing, children's stories and articles reflecting her interest in and love for the out-of-doors.

Some poems 
From "Songs of the West":

The Call of the Woods
There's a murmuring in the trees,
And a sighing on the breeze;
There's a calling from the robins on the hill;
And it fills my heart with pain
And a longing that is vain
To be up and out, a-wandering at my will.

There are wildflowers everywhere
Shedding fragrance on the air,
The butterflies are hurrying to and fro;
The squirrels and the bees
Are as busy as you please,
Out there among the hills where I would go.

For it's there that one can rest,
Lying close to Nature's breast,
And the breeze's lullaby is low and sweet,
So I turn my longing eyes
Where the stately mountains rise,
And the wooded hills are nestling at their feet.

Solace

Deep in the forest wandering,
From life's noise and strain apart,
Seeking the comfort of Nature
To quiet a restless heart.

There came in the shade and silence,
The calm of a presence near,
That stilled my pulse's throbbing,
While my soul drew close to hear.

How that Mother Spirit brooded
Over all things, small and great,
O'er each fragile fern and flower,
And the pines in lofty state.

Strengthened the tender seedlings,
The tempest-torn and scarred,
And clothed with strange new beauty
The fallen trees, and marred.

Then dark sorrow fled before her
For instead of sting and smart,
She gave to my troubled spirit
New peace from her own great heart.

References

External links
Marion Moodie's 353 botanical submissions to the Smithsonian Institution
 https://web.archive.org/web/20070929045853/http://www.vcrossing.com/about_victoria_crossing/history/historic_people.html
 http://www.archivesalberta.org/walls/pics/glenbow2_lg.jpg
 http://www.collectionscanada.ca/wbin/resanet/resultsm/l=0/d=1/r=1/e=0/s=s/n=NK/h=30/t=2513824/u=Author=Moodie,+Marion+E.+(Marion+Elizabeth),+b.+1867
 

1867 births
1958 deaths
Canadian nurses
Canadian women nurses
Canadian women botanists
Canadian women poets
Writers from Quebec City
19th-century Canadian poets
19th-century Canadian women writers
19th-century Canadian botanists
20th-century Canadian botanists
19th-century Canadian women scientists
20th-century Canadian women scientists